Andrew Turner and his wife Sharon Turner are owners of a personal finance company in Norfolk, England.

Business
The couple owns personal finance company Norfolk Capital Limited. Andrew Turner is Norfolk Capital’s executive chairman and Sharon is a non-executive director on the board.  Andrew has been included in Management Today’s list of Britain’s top 100 entrepreneurs on five occasions and Norfolk Capital has appeared in numerous listings of the fastest growing companies, including those produced by The Sunday Times, The Independent, Bloomberg Businessweek and Real Business.

Here is a list of some of the companies in the CT Capital Group:
Commercial Trust Ltd
Mercantile Trust Ltd
Central Trust Ltd
The Loans Engine Ltd.

Norwich City F.C.
The couple joined the Norwich City Football Club board when they acquired Barry Skipper's 5000 shares. Their first action was to loan the club £2 million to cover an expected cash shortfall, meaning City were not forced to sell players to balance the books.

Personal
The Turners live in Norfolk. Both maintain an active interest in the local community and Sharon is the Chair of Governors for a local school. Both work and contribute regularly to select local charity projects, as well as The Prince's Trust.

Andrew holds dual membership of the Chartered Institute of Management Accountants and the Association of Chartered Certified Accountants, and also has an MBA from City University London.  Sharon holds membership of the CIMA.

References

Companies owned by Andy Turner:
Commercial Trust Ltd
Mercantile Trust Ltd
Central Trust Ltd
The Loans Engine Ltd.

Norwich City F.C.
Living people
Married couples
Year of birth missing (living people)